Deng Wei (born 14 February 1993) is a Chinese retired weightlifter. She is an Olympic Champion, five-time World Champion and Asian Champion. She competed in the 58 kg and 63 kg categories until 2018 and 64 kg starting in 2018 after the International Weightlifting Federation reorganized the categories.

Career
She competed at the 2016 Summer Olympics in the 63 kg category. She put on a dominating display, she matched the Olympic Record of 115 kg in the snatch, and set new World Records in the clean & jerk and total. She outlifted the silver medalist Choe Hyo-sim by 14 kg.

In 2018 she competed at the 2018 World Weightlifting Championships in Ashgabat, sweeping gold medals in all lifts, while setting 5 new senior world records, and outlifting the silver medalist Rim Un-sim by 14 kg.

Throughout her career she has set 20 senior world records.

Major results

See also
List of Olympic medalists in weightlifting
List of Youth Olympic Games gold medalists who won Olympic gold medals

References

External links
 
 
 
 

1993 births
Living people
People from Sanming
Weightlifters from Fujian
Chinese female weightlifters
Olympic weightlifters of China
Olympic medalists in weightlifting
Weightlifters at the 2016 Summer Olympics
2016 Olympic gold medalists for China
Weightlifters at the 2010 Summer Youth Olympics
World Weightlifting Championships medalists
Asian Games silver medalists for China
Weightlifters at the 2014 Asian Games
Asian Games medalists in weightlifting
Medalists at the 2014 Asian Games
Youth Olympic gold medalists for China
21st-century Chinese women